Tekmal is a village, and Mandal in Medak District in Telangana, India. It is 140 km to the north of Hyderabad.

Geography
It has an average elevation of 455 metres (1496 feet).

References

Villages in Medak district